Cristoforo de Predis (1440-1486), was an Italian miniaturist and illuminator.

Biography
Cristoforo is part of the de Predis family of artists, where he was one of six brothers including Giovanni. He was born deaf and mute, in the parish of San Vincenzo in Prato to parents Leonardo de Predis and Margaret Giussani. The de Predis family hosted Leonardo da Vinci when he visited Milan for the commission Virgin of the Rocks, and Leonardo met Cristoforo on that occasion. Leonardo  later wrote about what can be learned from deaf people in his treatise on painting Codex Urbinas.

There are four known works of de Predis, based on his signature. Records indicate de Predis was commissioned by the Borromeo family to produce the Borromeo Book of Hours.

References

15th-century Italian painters
Italian male painters
Painters from Milan
Manuscript illuminators
1440 births
1486 deaths
Artists from Milan
Italian deaf people
Mute people